California Dreams is an American teen sitcom. The series ran for five seasons, airing on NBC from September 12, 1992 to December 14, 1996, as part of the network's Saturday morning TNBC teen-focused programming block. It was created by writers Brett Dewey and Ronald B. Solomon, was produced by Franco Bario, and was executive produced by Peter Engel as his first followup to Saved by the Bell for NBC. California Dreams centered on a group of friends who form the fictional titular band.

Series overview

Episodes

Season 1 (1992) 
In its first season, California Dreams was conceived as being as much a family sitcom as a teen sitcom about the titular band, which is reflected by the fact that the Garrison parents, as well as Matt and Jenny Garrison's younger brother Dennis, were a part of the cast: 

 Brent Gore as Matt Garrison
 Heidi Noelle Lenhart as Jenny Garrison
 Michael Cade as Sylvester "Sly" Winkle
 Kelly Packard as Tiffani Smith
 William James Jones as Tony Wicks
 Michael Cutt as Mr. Richard Garrison
 Gail Ramsey as Mrs. Melody Garrison
 Ryan O'Neill as Dennis Garrison

Season 2 (1993–94) 
In the second season of California Dreams, the Garrison family was de-emphasized – Heidi Noelle Lenhart herself left the show, and Jenny was written out in the season's third episode – and the show was refocused on the band, including the new band members – guitarist Jake, and new singer Sam Woo (from the fourth episode of season 2 on): 

 Brent Gore as Matt Garrison
 Heidi Noelle Lenhart as Jenny Garrison
 Kelly Packard as Tiffani Smith
 William James Jones as Tony Wicks
 Michael Cade as Sylvester "Sly" Winkle
 Jay Anthony Franke as Jake Sommers
 Jennie Kwan as Samantha Woo
Notes

Season 3 (1994–95) 
In the third season of California Dreams, the Garrison family element was completely eliminated and Brent Gore was dropped from the show. In his place, two new cast members were added – Lorena Costa, a rich girl who effectively became the band's groupie, and new keyboardist Mark Winkle, who is Sly's cousin. The cast from the show's third season remained unchanged through the fourth and fifth seasons of the series: 

 Kelly Packard as Tiffani Smith
 William James Jones as Tony Wicks
 Michael Cade as Sylvester "Sly" Winkle
 Jay Anthony Franke as Jake Sommers
 Jennie Kwan as Samantha Woo
 Diana Uribe as Lorena Costa
 Aaron Jackson as Mark Winkle

Season 4 (1995–96) 
The cast for the fourth season of California Dreams was the same as the cast for the third season.

Season 5 (1996) 
The cast for the fifth season of California Dreams was the same as the cast for the third and fourth seasons.

References

External links 
 
 

Lists of American sitcom episodes
Lists of American teen comedy television series episodes